Robert Smith was an English footballer who played in the Football League for Darwen.

References

Year of birth unknown
Date of death unknown
Association football forwards
Darwen F.C. players
English footballers
English Football League players